The Committee on the Philippines was a standing committee of the United States Senate from 1899 to 1921. The committee was established by Senate resolution on December 15, 1899, to oversee administration of the Philippines, which Spain had ceded to the United States as part of the settlement of the Spanish–American War. The committee was established by Senate resolution on December 15, 1899, even though the peace treaty signed in Paris on December 10, 1898, had not yet been ratified.

In 1921, the committee was terminated and jurisdiction over legislative matters concerning the Philippines was transferred to the newly created Committee on Territories and Insular Possessions.

History
At the time of the creation of the committee, the Philippines were in a state of civil turmoil that greatly concerned the Senate, where a debate raged between those who wished to extend U.S. sovereignty over the Filipinos and the anti-imperialists. Like the Committee on the Pacific Islands and Puerto Rico, the Committee on the Philippines focused on primarily on legal and economic matters, such as Philippine independence, administration of the islands by the Taft Commission, and trade issues. Matters relating to the suppression of the Philippine insurrection were often referred to the Senate Foreign Relations Committee.

Chairmen
 Henry Cabot Lodge (R-MA) 1899-1911
 Simon Guggenheim (R-CO) 1911-1913
 Gilbert M. Hitchcock (D-NE) 1913-1918
 John F. Shafroth (D-CO) 1918-1919
 Warren Harding (R-OH) 1919-1921

Lodge Committee
Henry Cabot Lodge, Republican of Massachusetts, was the committee's first chairman, serving until 1911. During this time, the committee was informally known as the Lodge Committee. In 1902, under Chairman Lodge, the committee carried out an investigation into allegations of war crimes in the Philippine–American War. The hearings commenced on January 31, 1902 and adjourned on June 28, 1902. They were closed to the public, except for three press associations. The final report came to 3,000 pages.

A remark to a Manila News reporter by newly promoted Brigadier General Jacob H. Smith on November 4, 1901, triggered the hearings, which eventually led to Smith's own court-martial and conviction. Smith said that he intended to set the entire island of Samar ablaze, and would probably wipe out most of the population.

Senator George Frisbie Hoar had been demanding an investigation after increasing evidence of U.S. military war crimes in the Philippine–American War. Hoar introduced a resolution to establish a select committee to conduct the investigation on January 13, 1902. However, Chairman Lodge argued that the hearings would be better conducted by the existing Committee on the Philippines. Anti-imperialists in the Senate feared a whitewash, because Lodge had been avoiding investigating mounting allegations of war crimes so much so that the U.S. Senate Committee on the Philippines had been inactive for several months.

Members, 1902

During the time of the committee investigation, the minority on the committee consisted of Democratic and Republican anti-imperialists, led by Senator Hoar, while the majority was dominated by imperialists, led by Chairman Lodge. Hearings often degenerated into shouting matches between the imperialists and anti-imperialists. Nothing came of the hearings.

Eugene Hale was the only other Republican to vote with Hoar against the Treaty of Paris

Investigation

Initial hearings

Governor William Howard Taft had arrived in the Philippines in June 1900 with the Taft Commission to set up a civilian government. Taft was the first to testify in the Lodge Committee. As a lawyer, Taft would be assumed to have been a safe witness, but he conceded under questioning that "the torturing of natives by so-called water-cure and other methods" had been used "on some occasions to extract information"..."There are some amusing instances of Filipinos who came in and said they would not say anything unless tortured; that they must have an excuse for what they proposed to say." As Miller writes, "Very few died from the water cure, a mild form of torture."

Taft was immediately followed by three pro-imperialist witnesses. General Robert P. Hughes, chief of staff to General Elwell S. Otis, testified for two weeks in March 1902. In his testimony, Hughes conceded that Filipino houses were burned indiscriminately as a strategy to eliminate shelters and hiding places for guerrillas and as a deterrent. During questioning, Senator Charles Dietrich followed up by asking Hughes to estimate the value of these houses. Hughes said they only took a few days to build, and cost between $1.50 and $4.00. Senator Joseph Rawlins continued the questioning:

Rawlins: If these shacks were of no consequence what was the utility of their destruction?
Hughes: The destruction was a punishment. They permitted these people to come in there and conceal themselves and they gave no sign. It is always--
Rawlins: The punishment in that case would fall, not upon the men, who could go elsewhere, but mainly upon the women and little children.
Hughes: The women and children are part of the family, and where you wish to inflict a punishment you can punish the man probably worse in that way than in any other.
Rawlins: But is that within the ordinary rules of civilized warfare? Of course you could exterminate the family which would be still worse punishment.
Hughes: These people are not civilized.
Rawlins: But is that within the ordinary rules of civilized warfare?
Hughes: No; I think it is not.
Dietrich: In order to carry on civilized warfare both sides have to engage in such warfare.
Hughes: Yes sir; certainly that is the point, I think that if I am allowed to go on I will come to a place where I shall have something to say that will bear directly on the subject.

Senator Hale commented that the war had become less and less civilized with each successive commander, to which Hughes agreed saying "from summer to summer, the conduct of the war was sterner, stiffer, as you call it."

David Prescott Barrows, school director in the Philippines testified, claiming that anti-imperialist factions in the press had grossly distorted the situation. For example, concentration camps and the water cure were explained in the press as "more terrible than they are." He claimed Filipinos in the camps were "there of their own volition", for they "are pleased with it, because they are permitted to lead an easier life--much easier than at home." He went on to claim that alleged torture via the water cure "injured no one." While stating his belief that the natives had benefited from the war, Barrows stated he did not "wish to assent to the proposition that war is a good thing ... but where you have a war existing, it is, I think, better to go ahead and pursue it rigorously and finish it."

A fourth witness, General Elwell Stephen Otis testified the week of March 20, claiming here had been no warfare in the Philippines for the past two years. Senator Hale questions that statement, saying "there have been a good many fights since." Otis alleged any such fighting was due to "robbers", and that he and his men "were laughed at by the Spaniards and European officers for the humanity that we exercised." The committee proceeded to take a two-week break before continuing with hearings.

Hearings continue
Major Cornelius Gardener, a West Point graduate serving as provincial governor of Tayabas, the province next to Batangas, submitted a report to the committee, which Chairman Lodge laid before the committee on April 10, 1902.

The Committee on the Philippines refused to subpoena Major Cornelius Gardener in a May 1, party-line vote. Committee members Senator Thomas Patterson decried this move in a speech on the Senate floor. Senator Benjamin Tillman, a Democrat from South Carolina, similarly objected to this move, claiming information was being "smothered."

Emilo Aguinaldo
Democrats on the committee pressed Lodge to call as witnesses Emilio Aguinaldo, the Filipino general and independence leader, and several others they thought necessary for the committee to hear. In addition to Mr. Aguinaldo, Mr. Rawlings proposed calling Apolinario Mabini, one of Aguinaldo's principal advisors and Prime Minister of the declared Filipino revolutionary government; Sixto Lopez, an advocate for Philippine independence; Judge Pío del Pilar, General Torres, Howard W. Bray, an Englishman, who has spent many years in the Philippines, Robert M. Collins, and Harold Martin, both Associated Press correspondents. The committee refused this request as well as one that would have sent a subcommittee to the Philippines to collect testimony.

Instead, Mr. Lodge subpoenaed several veterans from a so-called "safe list" supplied by Secretary of War Elihu Root. However, when the soldiers appeared, they began to lecture the committee on the necessity of shooting and burning all Filipinos because of their "inability to appreciate human kindness."

Sergeant L. E. Hallock, Private William J. Gibbs, George C. Boardman, Captain Lee Hall, Richard Thomas O'Brien all testified to what they had seen during their service in the Philippines, including torture of Filipino prisoners, including use of the water cure, murder of natives, and other harassment.

Chairman Lodge countered with details of the murder of Private O'Herne. The witness said that in June 1900, O'Herne, with two other members of the company, had been sent to Iloilo for mail, and that on their return, on June 30, they were ambushed by 100 natives, and O'Herne's companions captured. O'Herne had made a dash to get away, and after escaping from the attacking party, had fallen in with other natives supposed to be friendly, but that instead of proving to be so they had devoted the entire next day to his torture and death, beginning at daylight by cutting him with bolos and then roasting him all day by a slow fire, not finishing up until night. All these details had, the witness said, been gathered from the confessions of the men to whom they had given the cure. Sergeant Hallock described the torture of around a dozen natives at the town of Leon, Panay. He said they were captured and tortured in order to secure information of the murder of Private O'Herne.

Corporal Richard O'Brien, testified he had been present at Igbaras when the water cure was administered to the Presidente (or chief) of that town. "There was a Spanish woman in town--a woman of education--who was attacked by the American officers." The witness said he could not give the names of the officers, adding that he had not witnessed the incident, but that the woman's husband was his authority for the statement." O'Brien further testified that there was an "unwritten law out there to take no prisoners." He said "dum dum" bullets, or expanding bullets, were issued in the regular way with other ammunition. He had seen them strike a man and take the top of his head off.

General Arthur MacArthur

General MacArthur testified before the committee twice. On April 13, he initially discussed the short war with the Spaniards and the American cooperation with the Filipinos. Then later that month, he testified again, regarding the capture of Emilio Aguinaldo. The General testified he had used deception to capture Mr. Aguinaldo, saying "I am responsible in that matter in every way and particular. It was one of the deceptions frequently practiced in war, and whatever deception attached thereto, I take." He attributed the plan to Gen. Funston, but said he (MacArthur) was responsible for approving the plant. However, he insisted doing so did not violate the rules of civilized warfare. MacArthur also distanced himself from any alleged orders of General Jacob H. Smith to turn Samar a howling wilderness.

MacArthur said that absolute chaos would result should the Filipinos be given complete independence and the United States entirely withdraw from the islands. Aguinaldo also had told him it would be impossible at this stage of their evolution for his own people to establish a stable independent Government. He said Aguinaldo was at the time of the conversation a "qualified prisoner", but that there was no coercion or duress resorted to extract the statement.

In regards to the death toll in the Philippines, he said, "The destruction is simply incident to war, and of course embraces a very small percentage of the total population, which is dense." In response, Senator Patterson noted that the death toll in one province was nearly a third. Gen. MacArthur spoke of the capture of papers from high Filipino officials in which the information was contained that, if President McKinley should be re-elected, the insurgents would surrender to the authority of the United States.

Alleged war crimes

Concentration camps
Colonel Arthur L. Wagner, the Army's chief public relations officer, had spent two and a half years in the Philippines. Wagner testified in May, where he was questioned about concentration camps in the Philippines, 31 including deaths at the camps. In one camp, it was reported that the people were assembled according to villages, so that the people in all cases would have their old neighbors near them. So far as he had been able to observe, there was no evidence of want among the people there congregated. Moreover, they were surprisingly contented. Such camps, he insisted, were created to "protect friendly natives from the insurgents" and to "assure them an adequate food supply", while also teaching them "proper sanitary standards." People were limited to travel within 300 to 800 yards of the camp, beyond which was a so-called "dead line" that anyone caught crossing would be shot, though he claimed the standing order was not to shoot any helpless persons, or any others if the shooting could be avoided.

Colonel Wagner said that one of the principal purposes of concentrating the native people in the Philippines was to protect them against the Ladrones, which had been admirably accomplished. Another object of the camps had been that of facilitating the collection of the rice supplies in order to starve out the Ladrones and guerrillas. The result had been that hostile parties had practically disappeared and their leader, Malvar, had been captured. The policy had been necessary to "protect life and property, and he did not see how any other policy could have been successful. He said that the people were fed and given medical supplies, and the sanitation of the camps was looked after. He insisted that American camps in the Philippines no more could be compared to Valeriano Weyler's reconcentrado camps in Cuba than mercy could be compared to cruelty.

Over loud Republican protests, Senator Culberson began to read a letter from one of J. Franklin Bell's officers, which had been quoted in the Senate by Mr. Bacon, in which the officer described a concentration camp as a "suburb of hell." The chair ruled that unless the senator identified the author, who had asked to remain anonymous, it was "hearsay evidence" and directed the witness not to comment on it. But Culberson had already read part of the letter:

What a farce it all is ... this little spot of black sogginess is a reconcentrado pen, with a dead line outside, beyond which everything living is shot ... Upon arrival, I found 30 cases of smallpox, and average fresh ones of five a day, which practically have to be turned out to die. At nightfall crowds of huge vampire bats softly swirl out of their orgies over the dead. Mosquitos work in relays. This corpse-carcass stench wafts in and combined with some lovely municipal odors besides makes it slightly unpleasant here.

Torture of Filipinos
Col. Wagner said he had no personal knowledge of the tortures of the natives in the Philippines, but he gave several instances in which he had heard reports of torture. In most of these it was found on examination that the reports either were untrue or exaggerated.

Wagner said that he knew that one village had been burned because the citizens would not give information of the murderers of a native friendly to the United States.

After intense cross examination, Wagner agreed that some "innocents" had suffered in the Philippines, but he added that the same was true of every war and that it was an injustice as old as man. "The Almighty destroyed Sodom, notwithstanding the fact there were a few just people in that community." Senator Albert Beveridge replied, "I was thinking of that instance of Sodom and Gomorrah."

Senator Beveridge's conclusions

Senator Albert Beveridge published a separate senate document containing his views on the committee, published as Senate Document 422 in the 57th Congress, 1st session. Historian Miller criticized this secondary publication, calling it a "deceitful cut and paste job ... gleaning from the record anything that remotely supported his conclusion that the war was one of the most humane ones in history ... [Beveridge felt that] the Lodge committee had destroyed the malicious fiction of "the slanders of the Army".

See also
 Little Brown Brother
 Philippine–American War
 Frederick Funston

References

 
  "More Talk Of Filipinos Senators Lodge and Patterson Contradict Each Other. The Latter Wants More Reporters to Attend Commission's Hearings -- Mr. Teller Continues Monday's Speech."  New York Times Feb 13, 1902. p. 3
  "Governor Taft Talks Before Senate Committee. Civil Rule in All Filipino and Christian Provinces. Moros still under Martial Law--The Hospitality of the Islanders--Dispute with Jolo Sultan." New York Times, February 1, 1902, p. 3
   p. 245 "By this time, the hearing was in shambles, and when the ruffled naval hero (Dewey) stepped down on June 28, Beveridge, on instructions from Lodge, adjourned the committee for good.  Apparently there was no protest from the opposition. A petition from five leading anti-imperialists calling for an ad hoc congressional committee to go to the Philippines and investigate conditions there was ignored.  Beveridge had the last word in the "investigation" by gleaning from the record anything that remotely supported his conclusion that the war was one of the most humane ones in history and then publishing this deceitful cut-and-paste job as a separate senate document. (S. Doc. 422, 57th Congress., 1st Session) As far as Beveridge was concerned, the Lodge committee had destroyed the malicious fiction of "the slanderers of the Army."
  , p. 307
  Painting the Philippines with an American Brush Visions of Race and National Mission among the Oregon Volunteers in the Philippine Wars of 1898 and 1899 Oregon History Quarterly; Vol 104 No. 1, Spring 2003
  Found in the Lodge Committee documents, S. Doc 166, p. 2
  "Philippine Problem Before Senate. Senator Hoar Talks About Investigating Committee. Senior Massachusetts Senator Wants to Question Governor Taft About the Administration of the Islands." New York Times, January 15, 1902, p. 3
  Miller p. 212
  Miller p. 213-214: "(This testimony) almost coincided with the publication of a soldier's letter boasting that the writer had used the water cure on 160 Filipinos, all of whom save twenty-six died from the ordeal.  The army quickly extracted denials from the writer and his superiors." Benjamin O. Flowers, "Some Dead Sea Fruit of Our War of Subjugation," Arena 27 (1902): 647-53; (Philadelphia) City and State, Jan. 2, 1902; San Francisco Call, Jan. 3, Feb. 19, 20, 1902; New York Times, Feb. 25, 1902; S. Doc 311, part 1, p. 558-562; S. Doc. 205, 57th Congress, 1st session, page 3-4.
   George Percival Scriven: An American in Bohol, The Philippines, 1899-1901
  "Gen. Hughes's Retort.; Resents the Line of Questioning Adopted by Senator Patterson at Philippine Hearing." New York Times March 6, 1902. p. 9
  "Sharp Responses Made In Philippine Inquiry. Gen. Hughes Objected to Mr. Patterson's Method of Questioning Him Before Senate Commission." New York Times  March 7, 1902. p. 3
  "Gen. Hughes in Tilt With Senator Patterson. Witness Insists Upon Answering Questions His Own Way -- The Labor Problem in the Philippines." New York Times  March 9, 1902. p. 4
  "Gen. Hughes's Testimony. Felt as If He Were Fighting Children When Battling with Filipinos." New York Times  March 12, 1902. p. 2
  S. Doc 311, part 1, p. 679-728; Miller p. 216
  "Testimony Of Gen. Otis.; Circumstances Attending Occupation of Manila -- Aguinaldo Has Few Equals in Duplicity, He Thinks." New York Times  March 20, 1902. p. 3
  "Questions For Gen. Otis.; Senator Patterson Wanted His Letter to Aguinaldo Explained -- Effect of Speeches in the Senate." New York Times March 21, 1902. p. 3
  S. Doc 311, part 1, p. 729-848; Miller p. 216: "The San Francisco Call hooted that once again Otis could have saved himself some embarrassment by simply glancing at the newspapers before testifying.  Another successful Filipino ambush had been reported that very morning, and yet another letter from a soldier bragging of torturing and shooting prisoners was making the journalistic rounds." San Francisco Call March 18, 19, 20, 21
  "Told of "Water Cure" Given to Filipinos. Witness Went Into Details Before Senate Committee on the Philippines." New York Times, Feb. 25, 1902, p. 3: "Mr. Riley said that he had been in the Philippines from Oct. 25, 1899 to March 4, 1901."
  "Saw the Water Cure Given. Edward J. Davis, a Volunteer From Massachusetts, Testifies Before a Senate Committee." New York Times, April 17, 1902, p. 3
  
  Miller p. 232
  "Friction In Philippines; Gov. Gardener Charges Army with Using Harsh Methods. Natives Being Turned Against This Country, He Declares -- His Withheld Report Given Out." New York Times, April 11, 1902. p. 3; Miller, footnotes pg. 303  "Lodge refused to subpoena Major Gardener on the grounds that his "allegations were not properly sustained", according to the San Francisco Call, May 2, 1902."
  "Gen. Macarthur's Story; It Was of American and Filipino Troops at Manila. His Testimony Before the Senate Philippines Committee Related to Alleged Co-operation Against Spaniards." New York Times April 13, 1902. p. 8
  Miller p. 301, note 31
  Philippine Investigating Committee/Lodge Committee Report summary on wikisource; Miller p. 218
  Gen. Macarthur Testifies; He Disclaims Responsibility for Gen. Smith's Samar Order. Deception Practiced to Capture Aguinaldo -- "I Am Responsible, Not Gen. Funston", Declares Gen. MacArthur to Senators."  New York Times April 30, 1902. p. 8
  Will Not Call Maj. Gardener; Senate Committee on the Philippines Decides by a Party Vote -- Gen. MacArthur's Testimony." New York Times May 1, 1902. p. 3
  "Gen. Macarthur's Testimony; Aguinaldo, He Says, Admitted that His People Are Not Capable of Self-Government Now." New York Times May 2, 1902. p. 3
  "The Philippine Inquiry.; Senator Culberson (Texas) Interrogates Gen. MacArthur Regarding the Ad- vantage of Implanting Republican Institutions." New York Times May 3, 1902. p. 3
  Miller p. 239
  Miller p. 241
  "The Water Cure Described. Discharged Soldier Tells Senate Committee How and Why the Torture Was Inflicted." New York Times May 4, 1902. p. 13
  "One "Water Cure" Victim. Witness Tells of the Case Before Senate Committee. He Did Not See the Man Die, but Says Cause of Death Was Understood." New York Times May 11, 1902. p. 5
  ""Water Cure" And Wine. Witness Before the Senate Philippine Committee Says One Is No Worse than the Other." New York Times May 16, 1902. p. 5
  "Cruelty In Philippines. Corp. O'Brien Makes Accusation Against Army Officers." New York Times  May 20, 1902. p. 3
  "The Philippine Inquiry; Senators in a Warm Controversy Provoked by the Testimony of Corp. O'Brien." New York Times May 22, 1902. p. 8
  Miller p. 241
  "Bishop On The Philippines. Mr. Thoburn Says the American Occupation Was an Act of God -- His Testimony." New York Times  May 23, 1902. p. 3
  "Bishop Thoburn Testifies.; He Expresses the Opinion that Aguinaldo Could Not Have Subjugated the Philippines." New York Times   May 24, 1902. p. 8
  Miller p. 241-242
  "Denies Any Misconduct. Ex-Capt. McDonald Testifies Concerning Actions in Philippines. He Is the Officer Who Was Accused with Others by Corporal O'Brien -- His Statements." New York Times May 27, 1902. p. 3;
  "The Philippine Inquiry. Capt. McDonald Produces Documents to Refute the Testimony of Corporal O'Brien." New York Times  May 28, 1902. p. 8
  Miller p. 243
  The Concentration Camps. Assistant Adjutant General Wagner Describes One -- Filipinos Were Surprisingly Contented, He Says." New York Times  May 30, 1902. p. 3
  Says A Village Was Burned. Assistant Adjutant Gen. Wagner, U.S.A., Continues His Testimony Before the Senate Philippines Committee." New York Times   June 1, 1902. p. 5
  Miller p. 243, Senate Document 331, page 2846-2853, 2857-2859, 2877-2878, San Francisco Call, May 2, 1902.
  Miller p. 245

Further reading

The Philippine Investigating Committee hearings were published in three volumes as Senate Document 331, 57th Congress, 1st Session An abridged version of the oral testimony can be found in:

External links
Painting the Philippines with an American Brush Visions of Race and National Mission among the Oregon Volunteers in the Philippine Wars of 1898 and 1899 Oregon History Quarterly; Vol 104 No. 1, Spring 2003

1902 in the United States
Investigations and hearings of the United States Congress
Philippines
Philippine–American War
History of the Philippines (1898–1946)
War crimes in the Philippines
War crimes